Pleurobranchaea is a genus of sea slugs, specifically sidegill slugs or notaspideans. These are marine gastropod molluscs in the family Pleurobranchaeidae. The genus is differentiated from other sidegill slugs by its rhinophores, which are well separated, rather than being joined under the notum. This genus has recently been coined sea owls which is the common name in Japanese  for Pleurobranchaea japonica.

Species 
Species in the genus Pleurobranchaea include:
 Pleurobranchaea agassizii  R. Bergh, 1897 
 Pleurobranchaea augusta Ev. Marcus & Gosliner, 1984
 Pleurobranchaea brockii Bergh, 1897
 Pleurobranchaea bubala Marcus and Gosliner, 1984
 Pleurobranchaea californica MacFarland, 1966
 Pleurobranchaea catherinae Dayrat, 2001
 Pleurobranchaea gela Er. Marcus & Ev. Marcus, 1966
 Pleurobranchaea inconspicua Bergh, 1897
 Pleurobranchaea japonica  J. Thiele, 1925 
 Pleurobranchaea maculata (Quoy and Gaimard, 1832)
 Pleurobranchaea meckeli (Blainville, 1825)
 Pleurobranchaea morosa (Bergh, 1892)
 Pleurobranchaea obesa  (A. E. Verrill, 1882)
 Pleurobranchaea spiroporphyra Alvim, Simone & Pimenta, 2014
 Pleurobranchaea tarda A. E. Verrill, 1880
Species brought into synonymy
 Pleurobranchaea bonnieae  Ev. Marcus and Gosliner, 1984 : synonym of Pleurobranchaea inconspicua Bergh, 1897
 Pleurobranchaea chiajei Locard, 1886: synonym of Pleurobranchaea meckeli (Blainville, 1825)
 Pleurobranchaea confusa Ev. Marcus & Gosliner, 1984: synonym of Pleurobranchaea obesa (A. E. Verrill, 1882)
 Pleurobranchaea dellechiaii Vérany, 1846: synonym of Pleurobranchaea meckeli (Blainville, 1825)
 Pleurobranchaea gemini Macnae, 1962: synonym of Pleurobranchaea brockii Bergh, 1897
 Pleurobranchaea hamva Er. Marcus & Ev. Marcus, 1955: synonym of Pleurobranchaea inconspicua Bergh, 1897
 Pleurobranchaea hedgpethi Abbott, 1952: synonym of Pleurobranchaea inconspicua Bergh, 1897
 Pleurobranchaea notmec Ev. Marcus & Gosliner, 1984: synonym of Pleurobranchaea meckeli (Blainville, 1825)
 Pleurobranchaea novaezealandiae Cheeseman, 1878: synonym of Pleurobranchaea maculata (Quoy & Gaimard, 1832)
 Pleurobranchaea vayssierei Ev. Marcus & Gosliner, 1984: synonym of Pleurobranchaea meckeli (Blainville, 1825)

References

Pleurobranchaeidae